Tomb of the Angels (Italian: La fossa degli angeli) is a 1937 Italian drama film directed by Carlo Ludovico Bragaglia and starring Amedeo Nazzari, Luisa Ferida, and Antonio Gradoli. Roberto Rossellini co-wrote the screenplay and served as assistant director. It was shot on location in the Apuan Alps in Liguria, and is set amidst the marble quarries of the area. It marked an early attempt at realism in Italian cinema, anticipating neorealism of the postwar era. It is similar in style to Walter Ruttmann's Steel of 1933, in it celebrated Italy's industrial strength in line with the propaganda of the Mussolini regime.

Cast
 Amedeo Nazzari  as Pietro 
 Luisa Ferida  as Luisa 
 Antonio Gradoli as Domenico 
 Annette Ciarli as La madre di Luisa 
 Vinicio Sofia as Angiolino 
 Leo Chiostri

References

Bibliography
 Brunetta, Gian Piero. The History of Italian Cinema: A Guide to Italian Film from Its Origins to the Twenty-first Century.  Princeton University Press, 2009.

External links

1937 films
Italian drama films
1937 drama films
1930s Italian-language films
Films directed by Carlo Ludovico Bragaglia
Lux Film films
Films scored by Enzo Masetti
1930s Italian films